Mera Yaqeen() is a 2012 Pakistani drama serial aired on ARY Digital. Serial is directed by Sarmad Khoosat and written by Seema Munaf. Starring Faisal Qureshi, Savera Nadeem, Nimra Bucha and Farhan Ali Agha, it was a production of A&B Entertainment. The drama serial follows the life of a happy married couple who are happy in their life until they meet with disaster.

Cast 
 Faisal Qureshi as Asfar, Maha's husband
 Savera Nadeem as Maha, Nazish's best friend. Married to Asfar
 Nimra Bucha as Nazish, Maha's best friend; first married to Ahmer and then Faiz
 Zaheen Tahira as Bua
 Shehryar Zaidi as Maha's father
 Maria Zahid
 Naveen Waqar as Nimra
 Farhan Ally Agha as Ahmer, Nazish's first husband
 Sami Sani

Reception 

The series gathered praise for performances of the lead cast but received negative reviews due to storyline.

Accolades

References

External links 
 Official website
 

ARY Digital original programming
2012 Pakistani television series debuts
2012 Pakistani television series endings
Urdu-language television shows
Pakistani drama television series
A&B Entertainment